“To Atlanta” (This is Atlanta) is a single by Edyta Górniak for the 1996 Olympic Games.

Background 

"To Atlanta" was the Polish anthem for the Olympic Games '96 which took place in Atlanta, USA. The single was released exclusively in Poland and was produced for Polish Olympic Foundation. The song has never been released on any of Edyta's albums.

The single cover includes pictures of Edyta (by Marlena Bielińska) as well as various athletes (by IndexStock).

Track listing

CD 
 To Atlanta (3:41)
 To Atlanta (wersja akustyczna) (3:49)
 To Atlanta (wersja symfoniczna) (3:03)

Cassette 
 To Atlanta (3:41)
 To Atlanta (wersja akustyczna) (3:49)
 To Atlanta (wersja symfoniczna) (3:03)

References 

1996 singles
1996 songs